Too Many Ways to Be No.1 is a 1997 gangster drama directed by Wai Ka Fai, starring Lau Ching Wan, Carman Lee, Francis Ng, Cheung Tat Ming, Matt Chow, Elvis Tsui, Cheng Cho and Ruby Wong. Made in 1997, this is the first formal film produced by Milkyway Image

Synopsis
Bo invites Gau, a poor gangster living in Hong Kong, to join him in smuggling valuable cars back to China. What Gau doesn't know is that accepting the offer will lead him on a journey of endless misfortune and death in China. However, leaving the gang before they start their job will take him on another journey of fighting for dignity and honour in Taiwan.

Cast
Lau Ching Wan as A Gau (阿狗)
Carman Lee 
Francis Ng as Matt (阿貓)
Cheung Tat-ming as Bo (大寶)
Matt Chow as Kei (喪基)
Elvis Tsui 
Cheng Cho as Big Chun (大春)
Ruby Wong as Bo's wife (大嫂)
Soong Pounh Chong as Small Chun (小春)

Awards
Too Many Ways to Be No.1 is nominated for the "Best Screenplay" award in the 17th Hong Kong Film Awards.
It is also included in the 'Films of Merit' list made by the Hong Kong Film Critics Society Award.

Notes

External links

Too Many Ways To Be Number One at the Hong Kong Movie Database

1997 films
1990s Cantonese-language films
Films directed by Wai Ka-Fai
Films set in Taiwan
Films set in Hong Kong
Hong Kong crime drama films
1990s Hong Kong films